The Asbestos Mountains is a range of hills in the Northern Cape province of South Africa, stretching south-southwest from Kuruman, where the range is known as the Kuruman Hills, to Prieska. It passes Boetsap, Danielskuil, Lime Acres, Douglas and Griekwastad. The range lies about 150 km west of Kimberley and rises from the Ghaap Plateau.

The mountains were named after the asbestos which was mined in the 20th century and is found as a variety of amphibole called crocidolite. Veins occur in slaty rocks, and are associated with jasper and quartzite rich in magnetite and brown iron-ore. Geologically it belongs to the Griquatown series.

The Griquas, for whom Griquatown was named,  were a Khoikhoi people who in 1800 were led by a freed slave, Adam Kok, from Piketberg in the western Cape to the foothills of the Asbestos Mountains where they settled at a place called Klaarwater. John Campbell, (1766–1840), a Scottish missionary in South Africa, renamed it Griquatown in 1813. The mission station became a staging post for expeditions to the interior - here David Livingstone met his future wife, Mary Moffat, daughter of the missionary Robert Moffat - William Burchell visited here in 1811.

John Campbell described the mountains in his book "Travels in South Africa: Undertaken at the request of the Missionary Society":

The coloured variants, which Campbell found, are named because of their chatoyance: tiger's eye, hawk's eye, and cat's eye by lapidaries, and are silicified crocidolite.

Wonderwerk Cave is located in the range near Kuruman and was occupied by man during the Later Stone Age, while much earlier manuports, introduced by hominins in the terminal Acheulean, have been found at the back of the cave.

Mining history
Serious mining of crocidolite in these mountains started in 1893 when open-cast quarrying produced 100 tons of material. By 1918, underground mining had started and scattered mines were to be found from Prieska to Kuruman along the length of the range, and mills were constructed at both of these towns. Between 1950 and 1960 production had risen to 100,000 tons, each mine was doing its own milling and the tailings dumps had grown in size.

Health hazards
At the time of Campbell's writing the health hazards of asbestos were unknown. Tens of thousands of mine workers were exposed to the fibres at their workplaces, and when winds blew across the wastedumps, at their homes. By the mid-1950s the medical profession were still diagnosing asbestosis as "metastatic carcinomas from an unknown primary site". The resulting increase in cases of asbestosis and mesothelioma became alarming. Records later revealed that pleural endothelioma had first been reported in 1917, but had also been considered as metastatic.
Substitutes for asbestos now include ceramic, carbon, metallic and Aramid fibers, such as Twaron or Kevlar.

David Goldblatt from the University of the Witwatersrand wrote:

The Green Mountains, for which Vermont was named, were produced by the same geologic processes that produced the Asbestos Mountains - they produced an abundance of serpentine, which is the source of chrysotile asbestos.

See also
 List of mountain ranges of South Africa
 Mining industry of South Africa
 Asbestos and the law

References and notes

Asbestos
Kimberley, Northern Cape
Mountain ranges of the Northern Cape